Ahn Gooc-jin  (born 1980), is a South Korean film director and screenwriter. Ahn's directorial feature debut Alice in Earnestland (2015) has won various awards, including New Talent Award at the 39th Hong Kong Asian Film Festival, Best Screenplay at the 52nd Baeksang Arts Awards and Best Independent Film Director at the 16th Director's Cut Awards.

Career 
Ahn was born in 1980.

Ahn had his TV debut in 2018 through the Drama Stage episode All About My Rival in Love.

Filmography 
Stop by My House (short film, 2008) - director, screenwriter, editor
A Little Pond (2009) - production assistant
Poetry (2010) - production assistant
Double Clutch (short film, 2012) - director, screenwriter, editor
The Weight (2012) - 1st assistant director
Alice in Earnestland (2015) - director, screenwriter, editor
Drama Stage: All About My Rival in Love (2018) - director
SF8 ("Baby It’s Over Outside" episode) (2020) - director

Awards 
2015 39th Hong Kong Asian Film Festival: New Talent Award (Alice in Earnestland)
2016 52nd Baeksang Arts Awards: Best Screenplay (Film) (Alice in Earnestland)
2016 16th Director's Cut Awards: Best Independent Film Director (Alice in Earnestland)

References

External links 
 
 
 

1980 births
Living people
South Korean film directors
South Korean screenwriters
Kyung Hee University alumni